Bernard Jomier, born on October 9, 1963 in Clermont-Ferrand, France, is a French physician and politician, sénateur of Paris since the 24 September 2017. On June 10, 2021, he carried a question and petition to the French senate and the French health Minister Olivier Véran requiring action to protect advocates of science integrity.

References 

Living people
French Senators of the Fifth Republic
Year of birth missing (living people)